Bheemili Assembly constituency is a constituency in Visakhapatnam district of Andhra Pradesh, representing the state legislative assembly of Andhra Pradesh in India. It is one of the seven assembly segments of Visakhapatnam (Lok Sabha constituency) namely Srungavarapukota, Visakhapatnam East, Visakhapatnam South, Visakhapatnam North, Visakhapatnam West and Gajuwaka. Muttamsetti Srinivasarao (Avanthi Srinivas) is the present MLA of the constituency, who won the 2019 Andhra Pradesh Legislative Assembly election from YSR Congress Party. As of 2019, there are a total of 305,958 electors in the constituency.

Mandals 
The four mandals that form the assembly constituency are:

Members of Legislative Assembly

Election results

Assembly elections 1952

Assembly Elections 2009

Assembly elections 2014

Assembly elections 2019

References

Politics of Andhra Pradesh
Assembly constituencies of Andhra Pradesh